Count 'Jan Sebastian Szembek’ (1672-1731) was a Polish szlachcic.

Recorder of the Crown since 1699, Vice-Chancellor of the Crown in 1703–1711, Grand Chancellor of the Crown since 1712. Starost of Łomża

Marshal of the Sejm on December 22, 1701 - February 6, 1702.

Further reading 
Listy Jana Jerzego Przebendowskiego podskarbiego wielkiego koronnego do Jana Szembeka podkanclerzego i kanclerza wielkiego koronnego z lat 1711-1728", ed. Adam Perłakowski, Kraków 2000.

1672 births
1731 deaths
Counts of Poland
Marshals of the Sejm of the Polish–Lithuanian Commonwealth
Crown Vice-Chancellors